Gopaldas Jhamatmal Advani Law College (GJALC) is a law school in Mumbai, India. It has been listed among the most preferred law colleges in the West Zone of India.
It is considered to be a top college for legal studies in Mumbai.

GJALC was established in 1977 by the Hyderabad (Sind) National Collegiate Board (HSNC).  It was established as an affiliated college to the University of Mumbai and recognised by the Bar Council of India, New Delhi, for teaching a 3-year degree course in law (LL.B.).
The alumni of the college hold prestigious positions in the field of law.

Library 
The college's library contains more than 11,60 documents and subscribes to over 30 national and international journals, law reports, and magazines.

History

The college is named after one of the leading advocates of Sind, Late Shri. Gopaldas Jhamatmal Advani, who was a scholar and author of a book entitled Arbitration and Specific Relief Act. He was also connected with many Educational Institutions in Sind as well as in Mumbai. The college has established its reputation for a high standard of teaching in law. The college is striving to make this college a centre of excellence in the field of Legal Education by adopting modern teaching and training techniques.

Recognitions
India Today, a weekly magazine (published in July 2006) ranked the college among the top 20 Law Colleges in India. The Week, a weekly magazine (published on 20 June 2010) listed the college among the Most Preferred Law Colleges in India (West Zone)

Alumni

 Ali Kaashif Khan, Advocate
 Mr Dharam Jumani, Counsel, High Court of Bombay
Mr Pradeep Kadu, Joint Commissioner of Sales Tax
 Ms Harshada Kawale, Judicial Magistrate (First Class), Pune District Court
 Mr Ashish Shelar, Member of the Maharashtra Legislative Assembly for H-West Constituency and President of Mumbai Unit of Bhartiya Janata Party.
 Ms Priya Dutt, Former Member of Parliament from Mumbai North West constituency representing Indian National Congress party.
 Mr N. Hariharan, Chief General Manager, SEBI.

References 

http://www.advanilaw.in/aboutcollege.html

Law schools in Maharashtra
Universities and colleges in Mumbai
Educational institutions established in 1977
1977 establishments in Maharashtra